Seizo Onoe, a Japanese telecommunication executive, is the Director of the Telecommunication Standardization Bureau of the International Telecommunication Union, the Secretariat of ITU-T. Onoe was elected to the post of Director of the TSB for the term 2023-2026 at the ITU Plenipotentiary Conference 2022 (PP-22).

Career 
Prior to being elected, Onoe had a career with Japanese mobile operator NTT DOCOMO for over thirty years. As of 2021, he served as Executive Vice President and Chief Standardization Strategy Officer for the Nippon Telegraph and Telephone (NTT) Corporation as well as simultaneously a Fellow of NTT DOCOMO.

Between 2017 and 2021, he served as NTT DOCOMO’s Chief Technology Architect as well as President of the DOCOMO Technology subsidiary.

From 2012 until 2017, Onoe held the position of Chief Technology Officer and Executive Vice President, (Member of the Board of Directors and Managing Director of R&D Innovation Division) at NTT DOCOMO. Prior to this, he served as Senior Vice President and Managing Director of NTT DOCOMO’s R&D Strategy Department and Managing Director of the company’s Radio Network Development Department.

Studies 
Seizo Onoe holds Master’s and Bachelor's degrees in Electrical Engineering from the Kyoto University (Graduate School of Engineering).

Personal life 
Mr. Onoe is married and has two children.

References 

International Telecommunication Union
International Telecommunication Union people
Living people
Year of birth missing (living people)